The Arizona Open Championship is the annual open state championship of golf in Arizona. The competition is 54-holes of stroke play (3 rounds on an 18-hole course), with the winner being the player with the lowest total number of strokes. Following 36-holes of play the field is cut to the top 50 players and ties for the final round. In the event of a tie following 54-holes, a hole-by-hole, sudden death playoff will determine the winner. The Championship is administered by the Southwest PGA (Professional Golfers' Association of America). The Arizona Open has roots dating back to the inaugural event held in 1937. This historical championship has been held annually since 1953 and boasts an impressive list of past champions including Johnny Bulla, Dale Douglas and Curt Byrum.

Qualification
The Arizona Open Championship is open to any professional golfer or to any amateur golfer with a USGA Handicap Index not exceeding 10.0. Players (male or female) may obtain a place in the Championship proper by being fully exempt or by competing successfully in qualifying. Approximately 1/3 of the field is made up of players who are fully exempt from qualifying. Competitors who are not fully exempt must register and compete in a qualifier. Place-winners from qualifying events, conducted historically throughout the month of July, along with those players exempt from qualifying, finalize the Championship field of 156 competitors.

Champions

a = Amateur
 PO  = Won in playoff
* = Championship was 36-holes
** = Championship was 72-holes
*** = Championship was shortened to 36-holes after two-day rain delay

Records
 Most titles: 5 by Johnny Bulla (1947, 1950, 1951, 1958, 1959)
 Most consecutive titles: 4 by Dell Urich (1937, 1938, 1939, 1940) 
 Most times runner-up (including ties): 3 by Johnny Bulla (1957, 1965, 1967), Bill Johnston (1964, 1968, 1973), Bill Garrett (1965, 1976, 1977) 
 Most often first or second (including ties): 8 by Johnny Bulla (1st 1947, 1950, 1951, 1958, 1959; 2nd 1957,  1965, 1967) 
 Most top 5 finishes (including ties): 12 by Johnny Bulla (1947-1973) 
 Most top 10 finishes (including ties): 17 by Johnny Bulla (1947-1975)
 Low 54-hole score: 197 (−19) by 3 players
 Low 36-hole score: 127 (−13) by Jake Younan (R1-2, 61-66), Troon Country Club, 2018
 Low 18-hole score: 61 (−9) by Jake Younan (R1), Troon Country Club, 2018
 Low first round score: 61 (−9) by Jake Younan (R1), Troon Country Club, 2018
 Low second round score: 63 (−9) by Ronnie Black, Alta Mesa Country Club, 1987 
 Low third round score: 63 (−9) by amateur Michael Feagles, Superstition Mountain Golf & Country Club, 2019 
 Largest victory margin: 15 by Al Mengert (over Dick Metz), Moon Valley Country Club, 1960

External links
Southwest PGA
Arizona Open Records & Statistics

Golf in Arizona
PGA of America sectional tournaments
State Open golf tournaments